Brandwijk is a small village in the Dutch province of South Holland. It is a part of the municipality of Molenlanden, and lies about 13 km west of Gorinchem.

The statistical area "Brandwijk", which also includes the surrounding countryside, has a population of around 290.

Brandwijk was a separate municipality between 1817 and 1986, when it became part of Graafstroom. Last one has become part of Molenwaard in 2013.

References

Former municipalities of South Holland
Populated places in South Holland
Molenlanden